The 2012 Buffalo Funds - NAIA Division I men's basketball tournament was held in March at Municipal Auditorium in Kansas City, Missouri. The 75th annual NAIA basketball tournament features 32 teams playing in a single-elimination format. The opening game started on March 14, and the National Championship Game was played on March 20.

Awards and honors
Leading scorer:
Leading rebounder:
Player of the Year: 
Most consecutive tournament appearances: 21st, Georgetown (KY)
Most tournament appearances: 31st, Georgetown (KY)

2012 NAIA bracket

See also
2012 NAIA Division I women's basketball tournament
2012 NCAA Division I men's basketball tournament
2012 NCAA Division II men's basketball tournament
2012 NCAA Division III men's basketball tournament
2012 NAIA Division II men's basketball tournament

References

NAIA Men's Basketball Championship
Tournament
NAIA Division I men's basketball tournament
NAIA Division I men's basketball tournament